Elections in the Netherlands Antilles were held for two territorial levels of government: the state, and the island territories.

The Netherlands Antilles had a multi-party system, with numerous political parties to form coalition governments after the elections. The Estates (Staten) consisted of 21 or 22 members, elected for a four-year term. Its seats were distributed among the island territories:

Table

2002 general election

2006 general election

The 2006 general election resulted in the last Estates that would sit for four years. It preceded the 2010 Netherlands Antilles general election, which took place in January and was dissolved upon the dissolution of the Netherlands Antilles.

2010 general election

See also
 Elections in Bonaire
 Elections in Curaçao
 Elections in Saba
 Elections in Sint Maarten

Notes 

 
Netherlands Antilles